Quilon (Kollam) may refer to, 

 Venad, a former state on India's south western Malabar Coast, alternatively known as the State of Quilon
 Kollam, a city in Kerala state, India, formerly Quilon
 Kollam district, in Kerala state, India encompassing the former city of Quilon